Rodd is a surname and may refer to:

 Anthony N. Rodd (born 1940), Australian botanist
 Brent Clements Rodd (1809–1898), Australian lawyer and landowner
 Edward Hearle Rodd (1810–1880), British ornithologist
 Francis Rodd, 2nd Baron Rennell (1895–1978), British army officer and civil servant 
 Helen Rodd (late 20th c./early 21st c.), Canadian zoologist
 John Rodd (early 21st c.), music recording engineer
 L. C. Rodd (1905-1979), Australian biographer
 Marcia Rodd (born 1940), American actress
 Michael Rodd (born 1943), English television presenter and businessman
 Rennell Rodd, 1st Baron Rennell (1858–1941), British diplomat, poet and politician

See also
 Rodd, Herefordshire, village in Herefordshire, England
 DeRodd, DeAndre McCullough's brother, on The Corner
 Fort Rodd Hill in Esquimalt, British Columbia, named for John Rashleigh Rodd
 Rod (disambiguation)
 Rudd (disambiguation)